James Elder may refer to:

 James Walter Elder (1882–1941), U.S. Representative from Louisiana
 Jim Elder (born 1934), Canadian equestrian
 Jim Elder (politician) (born 1950), Australian politician
 Jimmy Elder (born 1928), Scottish footballer